Maryan Synakowski (14 March 1936 – 25 January 2021) was a French footballer who played as a centre back.

Early and personal life
Born in Calonne-Ricouart, Synakowski was of Polish descent. His grandson Bruno was also a footballer.

Career
Synakowski played for Olympique Saint-Quentin, Sedan-Torcy B, Sedan-Torcy, Stade Français, Union Saint-Gilloise, Reims and Sedan. With Sedan-Torcy he won the 1961 Coupe de France Final.

He earned 13 caps for the France national team between 1961 and 1965. He declined a squad place at the 1966 FIFA World Cup.

References

1936 births
2021 deaths
French people of Polish descent
French footballers
France international footballers
Olympique Saint-Quentin players
CS Sedan Ardennes players
Stade Français (association football) players
Royale Union Saint-Gilloise players
Stade de Reims players
Ligue 1 players
Ligue 2 players
Challenger Pro League players
Association football defenders
French expatriate footballers
French expatriate sportspeople in Belgium
Expatriate footballers in Belgium